The 2015 Swedish Open was a tennis tournament played on outdoor clay courts as part of the ATP World Tour 250 Series of the 2015 ATP World Tour and as part of the International Series on the 2015 WTA Tour. It took place in Båstad, Sweden, from 13 through 19 July 2015 for the women's tournament, and from 20 through 26 July 2015 for the men's tournament. It was also known as the 2015 SkiStar Swedish Open for the men and the 2015 Collector Swedish Open for the women for sponsorship reasons. It was the 68th edition of the event for the men and the 7th edition for the women.

Points and prize money

Point distribution

Prize money 

1 Qualifiers prize money is also the Round of 64 prize money
* per team

ATP singles main-draw entrants

Seeds 

 1 Rankings are as of July 13, 2015

Other entrants 
The following players received wildcards into the singles main draw:
  Markus Eriksson
  Christian Lindell
  Elias Ymer

The following players received entry from the qualifying draw:
  Andrea Arnaboldi
  Rogério Dutra Silva
  Paul-Henri Mathieu
  Julian Reister

Withdrawals 
Before the tournament
  David Ferrer → replaced by  Ernests Gulbis
  Guillermo García López → replaced by  Luca Vanni

ATP doubles main-draw entrants

Seeds 

 Rankings are as of July 13, 2015

Other entrants 
The following pairs received wildcards into the doubles main draw:
  Isak Arvidsson /  Markus Eriksson
  Jonathan Mridha /  Fred Simonsson

WTA singles main-draw entrants

Seeds 

 1 Rankings are as of June 29, 2015

Other entrants 
The following players received wildcards into the singles main draw:
  Sofia Arvidsson
  Susanne Celik
  Rebecca Peterson

The following players received entry from the qualifying draw:
  Alizé Lim
  Mandy Minella
  Ysaline Bonaventure
  Maryna Zanevska
  Anett Kontaveit
  Arantxa Rus

Withdrawals
Before the tournament
  Kaia Kanepi → replaced by  Olga Govortsova
  Bethanie Mattek-Sands → replaced by  Yuliya Beygelzimer
  Christina McHale → replaced by  Richèl Hogenkamp
  Sloane Stephens → replaced by  Grace Min

During the tournament
  Serena Williams (right elbow injury)

WTA doubles main-draw entrants

Seeds 

 1 Rankings are as of June 29, 2015

Other entrants 
The following pairs received wildcards into the doubles main draw:
  Sofia Arvidsson /  Susanne Celik
  Cornelia Lister /  Malin Ulvefeldt

Withdrawals 
During the tournament
  Mandy Minella (low back injury)

Champions

Men's singles 

  Benoît Paire def.  Tommy Robredo, 7–6(9–7), 6–3

Women's singles 

  Johanna Larsson def.  Mona Barthel, 6–3, 7–6(7–2)

Men's doubles 

  Jérémy Chardy /  Łukasz Kubot def.  Juan Sebastián Cabal /  Robert Farah, 6–7(6–8), 6–3, [10–8]

Women's doubles 

  Kiki Bertens /  Johanna Larsson def.  Tatjana Maria /  Olga Savchuk, 7–5, 6–4

References

External links 

 Official website

Swedish Open
Swedish Open
Swedish Open
Swedish Open
July 2015 sports events in Europe